Defence Science and Technology Agency (DSTA) is a statutory board  under the purview of the  Ministry of Defence of the Government of Singapore.

DSTA is responsible for performing acquisitions management, systems management, systems development for the Singapore Ministry of Defence (MINDEF) and the Singapore Armed Forces (SAF).

History
DSTA was formed as a statutory board on 15 March 2000 by combining the Defence Technology Group from MINDEF with two other organisations, the Systems and Computer Organisation (SCO) and the Defence Medical Research Institute (DMRI) from the Defence Administration Group.

References

2000 establishments in Singapore
Government agencies established in 2000
Statutory boards of the Singapore Government
Organizations established in 2000